Crutwell is an organized hamlet in the Canadian province of Saskatchewan.

Geography 
It is located in the Rural Municipality of Shellbrook No. 493.

Demographics 

References

Designated places in Saskatchewan
Organized hamlets in Saskatchewan
Shellbrook No. 493, Saskatchewan
Division No. 16, Saskatchewan